The posting system is a baseball player transfer system that operates between Korea Baseball Organization (KBO) and the Major League Baseball (MLB). The system is based on the original posting system that was put in place between MLB and Nippon Professional Baseball (NPB) in 1998.

To be eligible for posting, a player must have first played at least seven years in the KBO. Under this system, when a KBO player is "posted," MLB holds a four-day-long silent auction during which MLB teams can submit sealed bids in an attempt to win the exclusive rights to negotiate with the player for a period of 30 days. If the KBO team accepts the winning bid, then the player is free to negotiate with the highest-bidding MLB team. If the MLB team and the KBO player agree on contract terms before the 30-day period has expired, the KBO team receives the bid amount as a transfer fee, and the player is free to play in MLB. If the KBO team rejects the winning bid or if the MLB team cannot come to a contract agreement with the posted player, then no fee is paid, and the player's rights revert to his KBO team.

Up to the end of the 2014–15 posting period, eight KBO players had been posted using the system. Of these, two signed Major League contracts immediately, one signed a minor league contract, four bids were rejected by KBO teams, and one could not come to a contract agreement during the 30-day negotiation period. The four players that have been acquired by MLB teams through the posting system are Hyun-jin Ryu, Jung-ho Kang, Byung-ho Park, and Ha-seong Kim.

Past postings
Of the 15 South Korean-born players who have played in MLB, three have entered the league using the posting system.

This player is a pitcher.

This player is a pitcher.

See also 

 Baseball in Korea
 Transfer in association football

Notes

Major League Baseball labor relations
KBO League
History of baseball